This is a list of the National Register of Historic Places listings in Marion County, Iowa.

This is intended to be a complete list of the properties and districts on the National Register of Historic Places in Marion County, Iowa, United States. Latitude and longitude coordinates are provided for many National Register properties and districts; these locations may be seen together in a map.

There are 28 properties and districts listed on the National Register in the county.

Current listings

|}

See also

 List of National Historic Landmarks in Iowa
 National Register of Historic Places listings in Iowa
 Listings in neighboring counties: Jasper, Lucas, Mahaska, Monroe, Warren

References

 
Marion
Buildings and structures in Marion County, Iowa